Eric Franklin McCoo, Jr. (born September 6, 1980) is a former American football running back in the National Football League (NFL) who played for one season for the Philadelphia Eagles.  He played college football for Penn State.

Early life
A native of Red Bank, New Jersey, McCoo earned High School All-American honors at Red Bank Regional High School.

College career
McCoo finished his college career ranked ninth on Penn State's all-time rushing list with 2,518 yards, leading the Nittany Lions in rushing three years.  As a freshman, he compiled 822 yards on 127 carries and posted the top single-game rushing total by a freshman in school history (206 yards vs. Michigan State).

McCoo majored in recreational management at Penn State.

Professional career
McCoo began his professional career as a rookie free agent with the Chicago Bears in 2002, but was then acquired by the Philadelphia Eagles as a free agent following the 2003 season.  Allocated by Philadelphia to NFL Europa, he led the league in rushing and won MVP of World Bowl XII with the Berlin Thunder, highlighted by a World Bowl record 67-yard touchdown run.  McCoo parlayed his successful NFL Europe experience into a spot on the Eagles practice squad on September 22, 2004, and was later promoted to the active roster on December 28, 2004, during the Eagles run to a NFC championship and appearance in Super Bowl XXXIX. He played in the final regular season game, rushing for 54 yards on nine carries with two receptions for 15 yards.

McCoo was released by the Eagles before the 2005 season and was not claimed by any other team.

Provided by Pro-Football-Reference.com: View Original Table
Generated 4/20/2018.

Personal

References

1980 births
Living people
People from Red Bank, New Jersey
Players of American football from New Jersey
Red Bank Regional High School alumni
Sportspeople from Monmouth County, New Jersey
American football running backs
Penn State Nittany Lions football players
Berlin Thunder players
World Bowl MVPs
Philadelphia Eagles players